Costa Rica Esporte Clube, commonly referred to as Costa Rica, is a Brazilian professional football club based in Costa Rica, Mato Grosso do Sul founded on 2 December 2004.

Stadium
Dourados play their home games at Laertão. The stadium has a maximum capacity of 6,000 people.

Honours
 Campeonato Sul-Mato-Grossense
 Winners (1): 2021

References

External links
 Costa Rica on Facebook
 Costa Rica on Globo Esporte

Football clubs in Mato Grosso do Sul
Association football clubs established in 2004
2004 establishments in Brazil